Jim Almgren Gândara (born 2 May 1986, Gothenburg and raised in Härnösand) is a Swedish singer, and former guitarist in the American rock band Carolina Liar.  Gândara was a contestant on the Swedish Idol 2005, being cut just before the Top 10. He is currently the lead vocalist of the Swedish rock band Snöblind (Snowblind).

Discography

Albums
With Carolina Liar
Coming To Terms, 2008, (Atlantic Records) No. 19 Top Heatseekers

With Snöblind
Jag Är Marken, Du Är Skalvet, 2017, (Tick Tick Tick Records)

Singles
With Snöblind
"Hjärtslag (LTCMNDR Remix)", 2015 (independent release)
"Hjärtslag", 2015 (independent release)
"Allt Är Över Nu", 2015 (independent release)
"Godmorgon Sverige", 2011 (Warner Music Sweden)
"Kan Själv – Remixes", 2011 (Warner Music Sweden)
"Kan Själv", 2011 (Warner Music Sweden)
With Carolina Liar
"I'm Not Over", (2008) No. 119 US, No. 3 US Mod, No. 28 AUS
"Show Me What I'm Looking For", (2008) No. 31 US Mod No. 67 Billboard Hot 100 No. 6 US Heatseekers.

TV appearances
The Ellen DeGeneres Show (6 May 2009)
90210 (3 February 2009)
Jimmy Kimmel Live! (12 June 2008)
Idol 2005

References

1986 births
Living people
Musicians from Gothenburg
Idol (Swedish TV series) participants
21st-century Swedish singers
21st-century Swedish male singers